Petrus Antonius Josephus Maria "Piet" Steenkamp (8 March 1925 – 8 January 2016) was a Dutch politician of the Christian Democratic Appeal (CDA) party.

From 1949 to 1954, Steenkamp was a business economics employee in his father's factory, the N.V. Uithoornse Bacon and Conservenfabriek "De Hoorn". He was then a member of the Board of Directors of this company until September 1, 1966. He introduced the distribution of profits and employee participation in the plant.

He played an important role in the formation of the party and is therefore referred to as the father of the CDA. He was president of the Dutch Senate from 1983 to 1991. He was succeeded by Herman Tjeenk Willink.

His son Jan-Benedict is a renowned marketing scholar, author and distinguished professor of Marketing at University of North Carolina at Chapel Hill.

He died in Eindhoven, North Brabant on 8 January 2016, 90 years old.

Decorations

References

External links
Official
  P.A.J.M. (Piet) Steenkamp Parlement & Politiek
  P.A.J.M. (Piet) Steenkamp Eerste Kamer der Staten-Generaal

 

 
 

 

1925 births
2016 deaths
Catholic People's Party politicians
20th-century Dutch politicians
Christian Democratic Appeal politicians
Chairmen of the Christian Democratic Appeal
Commanders of the Order of Orange-Nassau
Commanders of the Order of the Netherlands Lion
Dutch corporate directors
Dutch businesspeople
Dutch economists
20th-century Dutch historians
Dutch Roman Catholics
Dutch legal scholars
Dutch political party founders
Social historians
Academic staff of the Eindhoven University of Technology
Members of the Senate (Netherlands)
People from Uithoorn
People from Eindhoven
Presidents of the Senate (Netherlands)
Tilburg University alumni